Naryan-Mar Airport  is an airport in Russia located 3 km east of Naryan-Mar. It is a mixed civilian-military field, and is the only major facility airfield on the Barents Sea coast between Arkhangelsk and Novaya Zemlya. It served as a rear operations air base for Rogachevo air base on Novaya Zemlya. In 2017, 183,127 passengers traveled via this airport.

Airlines and destinations

Statistics

See also

References

RussianAirFields.com

External links

Russian Air Force bases
Soviet Air Force bases
Airports built in the Soviet Union
Airports in Nenets Autonomous Okrug